Throughout its history, Major League Baseball rivalries have occurred between many teams and cities. Rivalries have arisen for many different reasons, the primary ones including geographic proximity, familiarity with opponents, various incidents, and cultural, linguistic, or national pride.

Background

In the "Original 16" era (1901–60), there were eight teams in each league and teams in each league played each other 22 times a season. The National League did not implement this until the following year when the New York Mets and Houston Colt .45s (now the Houston Astros) entered play.

In , with the San Diego Padres, Seattle Pilots, Kansas City Royals, and Montreal Expos entering play as expansion teams, MLB split both leagues into two divisions with six teams each. Teams played a total of 90 intra-divisional games, playing teams within the division 18 times each and 72 inter-divisional games, playing each team in the other division 12 times. However, they still played each team in the other division 12 times, but the total number of inter-divisional games increased to 84. The National League did not institute this until , when the Florida Marlins and Colorado Rockies entered play.

In , MLB split each league into three divisions, but kept the 1993 format in scheduling. In , with the MLB adopting interleague play, the schedules were changed. The schedule for interleague play comprised 84 three-game series, namely six series (18 games) for each of fourteen AL teams and as many as six for each of 16 NL teams.

The new "unbalanced schedule" allowed for additional games in each season between divisional rivals, replacing additional series with teams outside the division. Due to the change, division rivals now played each other 17 or more times each season. The scheduling drew criticism both when it was enacted and after the fact, with some analysts even positing that the unbalanced schedule hurt intra-divisional play.

Teams play a total of 76 intra-divisional games, playing teams within the division 19 times each, and six or seven games against other teams in their leagues and 20 interleague games. The move of the Astros led to interleague play throughout the season. The number of interleague games against natural rivals was reduced from six to four. Beginning in 2023, intradivisional games were reduced to 13 while teams get three interleague games against each non-natural opponent and four against a natural rival.

American League

American League East

Boston Red Sox vs. New York Yankees

The Yankees–Red Sox rivalry is one of the oldest, most famous and fiercest rivalries in American sports. For more than 100 years, the Boston Red Sox and New York Yankees have been intense rivals.

The rivalry is often a heated subject of conversation in the Northeastern United States. Since the inception of the wild card team and an added Division Series, the AL East rivals have squared off in the American League Championship Series three times, with the Yankees winning in 1999 and 2003 and the Sox winning in 2004. The two also faced off in the American League Division Series in 2018, with the Red Sox winning in four games. The teams most recently played in a One-game playoff after the 2021 season, in which the Sox topped the Yanks at Fenway Park.

The 1978 division race is memorable for the Red Sox having held a 14-game lead over the Yankees more than halfway through the season. Similarly, the 2004 ALCS is famous for the Yankees leading 3–0 and ultimately losing a best-of-7 series. The Red Sox comeback is the only time in baseball history to date that a team has come back from a 3–0 deficit to win a series. 

In 2019, the rivalry was showcased in the first London Series, with the Yankees winning both games.

The rivalry is often termed the "greatest rivalry in all of sports." Games between the two teams often generate a great deal of interest and get extensive media coverage, including being broadcast on national television. In the stands it is very common for Yankees fans and Red Sox fans to taunt each other and more than occasionally get into fistfights, so security at both Yankee Stadium and Fenway Park is heavy when either team comes to town.

Boston Red Sox vs. Tampa Bay Rays

The Rays–Red Sox  rivalry is contested between the Tampa Bay Rays and Boston Red Sox. Though this rivalry is more recent than the Yankees-Red Sox rivalry, both teams have regularly competed for the AL East title since 2008, winning it a combined seven times in the past 13 years. They have also met in the postseason several times, most recently in 2021. Due to this level of close competition, the rivalry has been called one of the most competitive in the modern American League.

American League Central

Minnesota Twins vs. Chicago White Sox 

The Twins–White Sox rivalry is contested between the Minnesota Twins and Chicago White Sox.  Though both teams are charter members of the American League, the rivalry did not begin in earnest until the 2000s, when the White Sox and Twins consistently battled for the AL Central crown. In the 2000s, they combined to win 8 out of the 10 AL Central division titles of the decade. Their most prominent meeting occurred in the 2008 American League Central tie-breaker game, which was necessitated by the two clubs finishing the season with identical records.

American League West

Lone Star Series: Texas Rangers vs. Houston Astros

The Lone Star Series (also, Silver Boot Series) is a Major League Baseball rivalry featuring Texas' two major league franchises, the Texas Rangers and Houston Astros. It is an outgrowth of the "natural rivalry" established by MLB as part of interleague play as the Rangers are a member of the American League and the Astros were a member of the National League until .

During interleague play, the winner of the 6-game series was awarded the Silver Boot. If the series was split (3–3), the winner was the club which scored the most runs over the course of the series.

In , the Astros joined the American League West with the Rangers and changed their rivalry from an interleague to an intra-division rivalry, the Astros played their first game in the American League against the Rangers on Sunday Night Baseball that season. In 2015, both teams made the playoffs and were in a tight division race during most of the season.

Inter-Divisional

New York Yankees vs. Houston Astros
While fairly recent, as the teams have rarely met historically prior to interleague play due to the Astros originally being in the National League, the Yankees-Astros rivalry has taken over baseball. One of their most notable historic meetings came in an exhibition game on April 9, 1965, the inaugural game played at the Astrodome and the first under the Astros team name; the Astros won the game 2-1. As with other teams, the Yankees are known for signing away several star players from the Astros, including Roger Clemens, Lance Berkman, and Gerrit Cole. The Astros are the only team to no hit the Yankees twice, with two combined no-hitters in 2003 and 2022; they are also the only team to no-hit them since 1958. Since 2015, the Astros and Yankees, along with the Boston Red Sox, also tend to have the most wins in the American League. 

Since the Astros moved to the American League in 2013, the two teams have met in the postseason on four separate occasions, all of which have been won by the Astros. The first was the 2015 American League Wild Card Game, which Houston won 3-0. However, the rivalry did not truly begin until they met in the 2017 American League Championship Series, which Houston also won in seven games. The two would later meet in the 2019 American League Championship Series, with the Astros winning in six games. The animosity between the two teams has only grown stronger in recent years, especially due to the revelations of the Houston Astros sign stealing scandal, with some believing that the sign stealing cost the Yankees the 2017 pennant; others, meanwhile, cite that the Yankees' poor offensive numbers meant they were likely to lose regardless. Many Yankees and their fans also accused the Astros of cheating during the 2019 ALCS, most notably claiming that Jose Altuve used an electronic buzzer to tell him what pitch Yankees closer Aroldis Chapman was pitching when Altuve hit a walk-off home run to win the series. 

Many believe the rivalry continued to intensify during the 2022 season, particularly after Yankees general manager Brian Cashman blamed the Astros on a lack of postseason success for the Yankees, a comment some saw as hypocritical due to the Yankees having recently become the subject of a sign stealing scandal during the 2015-16 seasons. The two would go on to meet in the 2022 American League Championship Series. Prior to the series, a clip of a group of Yankees fans chanting "We Want Houston" went viral, with the phrase being adopted by the National League champion Philadelphia Phillies as well as the Astros players and fans themselves. The Astros would go on to win the series in a four game sweep. Because of the Astros' perfect playoff series streak against the Yankees, many see the rivalry as being heavily lopsided in favor of the Astros.

National League

National League East

Atlanta Braves vs. New York Mets

The Braves–Mets rivalry is a rivalry between the Atlanta Braves and New York Mets. Both clubs are members of the National League (NL) East division. The rivalry between the two clubs was particularly fierce during the late 1990s and early 2000s. as both teams competed for postseason berths and, most notably, met in the 1999 NLCS. Some believe the rivalry to have become more intense in the 2022 season, with both teams competing for the NL East division title and a first-round bye; the Braves won, but both teams lost in their first playoff series during the postseason. They are both considered the best teams in their division, both historically and in the current age.

New York Mets vs. Philadelphia Phillies

The Mets–Phillies rivalry is a rivalry between the New York Mets and Philadelphia Phillies. Both clubs are members of MLB's National League (NL) East division. The rivalry between the two clubs is said to be among the most fiercely contested in the NL. The two NL East divisional rivals have met each other recently in playoff, division, and Wild Card races.

Aside from several brawls in the 1980s, the rivalry remained relatively low-key before the 2006 season, as the teams had seldom been equally good at the same time. A notable moment in their early meetings was Jim Bunning's perfect game on Father's Day of 1964, the first perfect game in Phillies history, which happened when the Mets were on a losing streak.  The Phillies were near the bottom of the NL East when the Mets won the 1969 World Series and the National League pennant in 1973, while the Mets did not enjoy success in the late 1970s when the Phillies won three straight division championships. Although both teams each won a World Series in the 1980s, the Mets were not serious contenders in the Phillies' playoff years (1980, 1981, and 1983), nor did the Phillies seriously contend in the Mets' playoff years (1986 and 1988). The Mets were the Majors' worst team when the Phillies won the NL pennant in 1993, and the Phillies could not post a winning record in either of the Mets' wild-card-winning seasons of 1999 or 2000, when the Mets faced the New York Yankees in the 2000 World Series.

As the rivalry has intensified in recent years, the teams have battled more often for playoff position. The Mets won the division in 2006, while the Phillies won five consecutive division titles from 2007 to 2011. The Phillies' 2007 championship was won on the last day of the season as the Mets lost a seven-game lead with 17 games remaining. The Phillies broke the Curse of Billy Penn to win the 2008 World Series, while the Mets' last title came in the 1986 World Series.

In 2015, the Mets won the National League Championship Series for their fifth pennant while the Phillies entered a rebuild phase. The Mets beat the Phillies 14 times and lost 5 for a lopsided season series. The season still provided contentious moments such as, Mets pitcher Matt Harvey drilling Phillies 2nd baseman Chase Utley in retaliation for Mets players getting hit by Phillies pitchers, a benches clearing argument between Phillies coach Larry Bowa in regards to a quick pitch by Hansel Robles and a bat flip by Daniel Murphy.

There is a long-standing bitter rivalry between the sports fans from New York City and Philadelphia, which are approximately two hours apart by car, also between the New York Giants and the Philadelphia Eagles in the National Football League, and the New York Rangers and the Philadelphia Flyers in National Hockey League. Games between the two teams at Citi Field and Citizens Bank Park are often very intense, hard-hitting affairs, as each home crowd does its best to create an unfriendly, sometimes volatile atmosphere for any visiting-team fans.

National League Central

I-94 Series: Chicago Cubs vs. Milwaukee Brewers

The Brewers–Cubs rivalry (also known as the I-94 rivalry because the clubs' ballparks are connected by an 83.3-mile drive along Interstate 94) refers to games between the Milwaukee Brewers and Chicago Cubs. The rivalry followed a 1969-97 rivalry between the Brewers, then in the American League, and the Chicago White Sox. The proximity of the two cities and the Bears-Packers football rivalry helped make the Cubs-Brewers rivalry one of baseball's best. In the 2018 season, the teams faced off in a Game 163 for the NL Central division title, which Milwaukee won.

Chicago Cubs vs. St. Louis Cardinals

The Cardinals–Cubs rivalry refers to games between the St. Louis Cardinals and Chicago Cubs. The Cubs lead the series 1,091–1,044 through , while the Cardinals lead in National League pennants with 19 against 17 for the Cubs. However, the Cardinals have a clear edge when it comes to World Series successes, having won 11 championships, while the Cubs have only won 3. Cardinals-Cubs games see numerous visiting fans in either St. Louis' Busch Stadium or Chicago's Wrigley Field. When the National League split into two, and then three divisions, the Cardinals and Cubs remained together. They had 3 pennant races in 1930, 1935, and 1945. The two teams met in the World Series of the nineteenth century when the Cardinals, then known as the Browns, were part of the American Association. The teams tied in 1885 and St. Louis won in 1886. St. Louis, however, has officially vacated their history from the AA. The first modern postseason meeting between the two teams was the 2015 NLDS, which the Cubs won 3 games to 1 before losing the 2015 NLCS to the New York Mets.

National League West

Los Angeles Dodgers vs. San Francisco Giants

The Dodgers–Giants rivalry began in the late 19th century when both clubs were based in New York City, with the Dodgers playing in Brooklyn and the Giants playing at the Polo Grounds in Manhattan. After the  season, Dodgers owner Walter O'Malley decided to move the team to Los Angeles for financial reasons, among others. Along the way, he managed to convince Giants owner Horace Stoneham (who was considering moving his team to Minnesota) to preserve the rivalry by bringing his team to California as well. New York baseball fans were stunned and heartbroken by the move. Given that the cities of Los Angeles and San Francisco have long been competitors in economic, cultural, and political arenas, the new venue in California became fertile ground for its transplantation.

Each team's ability to have endured for over a century while leaping across an entire continent, as well as the rivalry's growth in intensity from a cross-city to a cross-state engagement, have led to the rivalry being considered one of the greatest in sports history.

Unlike many other historic baseball match-ups in which one team remains dominant for most of their history, the Dodgers–Giants rivalry has exhibited a persistent balance in the respective successes of the two teams. While the Giants have more wins, and World Series titles in franchise history, the Dodgers have won the National League West twenty times compared to the Giants' eight, and a National League best twenty-four league pennants. The 2014 World Series was the Giants' third championship since moving to California, while the Dodgers' have won six, the most recent in the 2020 World Series. The 2021 NLDS marked the first time the two teams has ever played each other in the postseason with Los Angeles beating San Francisco in a winner-take-all Game 5.

Los Angeles Dodgers vs. San Diego Padres

The Dodgers–Padres rivalry has often been lopsided in favor of the Dodgers, however; recent growth between the two teams in competition has added intensity on top of proximity between Los Angeles and San Diego (driving from Dodger Stadium to Petco Park can be done by simply taking Interstate 5). San Diego fans have often harbored animosity towards Los Angeles due in small part to San Diego being an unstable home for their sports teams as both the Chargers and the Clippers both relocated to Los Angeles after being unable to find a secure future in San Diego.

The Dodgers currently lead the series 504-412, although both teams have a series win in the postseason (Los Angeles won the 2020 NLDS, while San Diego returned the favor in 2022). Off the field, the rivalry has been just as  competitive, as the two teams have aggressively battled on the trade market and free agency over star players, such as Juan Soto, Mookie Betts, Max Scherzer, and Trea Turner.

Inter-Divisional

St. Louis Cardinals vs. Los Angeles Dodgers

Both the Dodgers and Cardinals are two of the oldest franchises in the MLB, having first met during the 1900 season during the league's infancy; the Cardinals in 1882 and the Dodgers (originally known as the Bridegrooms) in 1883. Historically; both teams have not played in the same division; however frequent close pennant races and matchups in the postseason caused the rivalry to grow in intensity through the decades, particularly during the mid 1960s, when from 1963-1968 either team represented the National League in the World Series, or the 2000s when the two teams regularly met in the postseason. Both teams have met each other 1,975 times with 24 postseason games between them. The Cardinals currently have the most regular season wins at 1013, and the most postseason wins at 14.

Interleague

Background

Early discussions about interleague play

Interleague or interconference matchups have long been the norm in other professional sports leagues such as the National Football League. Regular-season interleague play was discussed for baseball's major leagues as early as the 1930s. In December 1956, Major League owners considered a proposal by Cleveland general manager and minority-owner Hank Greenberg to implement limited interleague play beginning in 1958.

Under Greenberg's proposal, each team would continue to play 154-games in the season, 126 of which would be within the league, and 28 against the 8 clubs in the other league. The interleague games would all be played during a period immediately following the All-Star Game. Notably, under Greenberg's proposal, all results would count in regular season game standings and league statistics. While this proposal was not adopted, the current system shares many elements. Bill Veeck predicted in 1963 that Major League Baseball would someday have interleague play. The concept did not take hold until the 1990s (at least in part as an effort to renew the public's interest in MLB following the 1994 players' strike).

First Interleague games

MLB's first regular season interleague game took place on June 12, 1997, when the Texas Rangers hosted the San Francisco Giants at Rangers Ballpark in Arlington. There were four interleague games on the schedule that night, but the other three were played on the West Coast, so the Giants–Rangers matchup started a few hours earlier than the others. Texas' Darren Oliver threw the game's first pitch and San Francisco outfielder Glenallen Hill was the first designated hitter used in a regular-season game by a National League team. San Francisco's Stan Javier hit the first home run in interleague play, and the Giants won the game 4–3.

For the first five seasons of Interleague Play, each division played against the same division from the other league (NL East vs. AL East, NL Central vs. AL Central and NL West vs. AL West), typically scheduled to alternate between home and away in consecutive years. However, in 2002, a new format to Interleague Play was instituted where teams play Interleague games against various divisions. Matchups which had been of particular interest prior to this format — mainly geographic rivals — were preserved. This is expected to be the continuing format of the interleague schedule. Corresponding divisions however, were skipped once when this rotation began, but were put back in the rotation in 2006.

From 2002 to 2012, all interleague games were played prior to the All-Star Game. Most games were played in June, though May games have been scheduled since 2005. Among the 224 interleague pairs of teams, 11 played six games every year, which were scheduled in two three-game series "home and home", or one at each home ballpark. Five of these matches feature two teams in the same city or in neighboring cities, where they wholly or partly share territorial rights. Six are regional matches at greater distance, four of which are in the same state.

Starting in 2023, MLB went to more balanced schedule. For the first time, every team in baseball will play every other team in baseball at least once.

Battle of the Beltways: Baltimore Orioles vs. Washington Nationals

Known as the Beltway Battle and as the Battle of the Beltways, after Washington's Capital Beltway (I-95/I-495) and Baltimore's Baltimore Beltway (I-695). The two teams first met in 2006, one year after the Montreal Expos relocated from Montreal to Washington, D.C., to become the Washington Nationals. Much of this rivalry is dominated by off-the field issues. Baltimore owner Peter Angelos publicly opposed relocating the Expos to Washington, which he believed was a part of his territorial rights after the departure of the second incarnation of the Washington Senators after the 1971 season. There are also controversies surrounding the value of the Nationals' television rights and their coverage on the Mid-Atlantic Sports Network.

Border Battle: Milwaukee Brewers vs. Minnesota Twins
The Border Battle is an annual interleague rivalry between the Milwaukee Brewers (NL-Central) and the Minnesota Twins (AL-Central). The rivalry started and was most heated when the Brewers were still in the American League before transitioning to the National League.

Crosstown Classic: Chicago White Sox vs. Chicago Cubs

The White Sox-Cubs rivalry (also known as the Wintrust Crosstown Cup, Crosstown Classic, The Windy City Showdown, Red Line Series, City Series, Crosstown Series, Crosstown Cup or Crosstown Showdown) refers to the rivalry between two Major League Baseball teams that play their home games in Chicago, Illinois. The Chicago Cubs of the NL play their home games at Wrigley Field located on the city's North side, while the Chicago White Sox of the AL play their home games at Guaranteed Rate Field on the city's South side. The terms "North Siders" and "South Siders" are synonymous with the respective teams and their fans, setting up an enduring rivalry. The Chicago Transit Authority's Red Line runs north–south through Chicago's neighborhoods, stopping at Wrigley Field on Addison Street and Guaranteed Rate Field on 35th Street.

Notably this rivalry actually predates the Interleague Play Era, with the only postseason meeting occurring in the 1906 World Series. It was the first World Series between teams from the same city. The White Sox won the series 4 games to 2, over the highly favored Cubs who had won a record 116 games during the regular season. The rivalry continued through of exhibition games, culminating in the Crosstown Classic from 1985 to 1995, in which the White Sox were undefeated at 10–0–2. The White Sox currently lead the regular season series 72–64.

Battle of Ohio: Cincinnati Reds vs. Cleveland Guardians

The Ohio Cup is between the National League (NL)'s Cincinnati Reds and the American League (AL)'s Cleveland Guardians. Both teams' cities are about 250 miles away via I-71. As of the 2022 season, the Guardians are ahead of the Reds by 17 with an all-time rivalry record 71–54.

Show-Me Series: St. Louis Cardinals vs. Kansas City Royals

The rivalry between the St. Louis Cardinals of the National League and Kansas City Royals of the American League is a Major League Baseball series sometimes known as the I-70 Series or the Show-Me Series. This rivalry is so called because the two cities are located in the state of Missouri, whose nickname is the "Show Me State", and both cities are located along Interstate 70. They played each other for the first time in the 1985 World Series, which the Royals won in seven games. Owing to their geographical proximity, the teams face each other every regular season in interleague play.

This prominent rivalry began with Royals' successes in the early '80's and fueled by the Royals' victory over the Cardinals in the 1985 World Series. The series is still a source of contention among fans, notably the controversial call in the bottom of the ninth of game 6 in which Jorge Orta was called safe on a play that replays later showed him out. A Royals rally let them tie and later win the game and then later the series.

Freeway Series: Los Angeles Angels vs. Los Angeles Dodgers

The term Freeway Series refers to a series of baseball games played between Major League Baseball's Los Angeles Angels of the American League and Los Angeles Dodgers of the National League. The series takes its name from the massive freeway system in the greater Los Angeles metropolitan area, the home of both teams; one could travel from one team's stadium to the other simply by traveling along Interstate 5. The Freeway series is extremely popular in Los Angeles and normally sells out their games due to the close proximity of both teams and their fans. Although the Dodgers have been the more historically successful franchise, the Angels hold the head-to-head advantage in meetings between the two teams.

Subway Series: New York Mets vs. New York Yankees

The Mets–Yankees rivalry is the latest incarnation of the Subway Series, the competition between New York City's Major League Baseball teams, the AL Yankees and NL Mets. Until Interleague play started, the two teams had only met in exhibition games. Since the inception of interleague play the teams have met in every season since 1997 and faced off in the 2000 World Series with the Yankees winning in five games.

Bay Bridge Series: Oakland Athletics vs. San Francisco Giants

The Bay Bridge Series is the name of the games played between—and rivalry of—the Oakland Athletics of the AL and San Francisco Giants of the NL. The series takes its name from the San Francisco–Oakland Bay Bridge which links the cities of Oakland and San Francisco. Although competitive, the regional rivalry between the A's and Giants is considered a friendly one with mostly mutual companionship between the fans, as opposed to the Chicago series (Cubs–White Sox), or the New York series (Mets–Yankees), where animosity runs high. While many fans have a very strong dislike for the other team, some others actually like both. Bay Area baseball fans tend to disagree with each other on this topic.

The series is also occasionally referred to as the "BART Series" for the Bay Area Rapid Transit system that links Oakland to San Francisco. However, the name "BART Series" has never been popular beyond a small selection of history books and national broadcasters and has fallen out of favor. Bay Area locals almost exclusively refer to the rivalry as the "Bay Bridge Series".

Originally, the term described a series of exhibition games played between the two clubs after the conclusion of spring training, immediately prior to the start of the regular season. It was first used to refer to the 1989 World Series in which the Athletics won their most recent championship and the first time both teams had met since they moved to the San Francisco Bay Area. Today, it also refers to games played between the teams during the regular season since the commencement of interleague play in 1997. Through August 2015, the A's have won 53 games, and the Giants have won 50.

Citrus Series: Miami Marlins vs. Tampa Bay Rays

The Citrus Series is the name given to the interleague series between the Miami Marlins and Tampa Bay Rays in Major League Baseball. The Marlins entered the league in 1993 as the Florida Marlins, while the Rays had their first season in 1998 as the Tampa Bay Devil Rays. The first meeting between the two teams took place on June 22, 1998 at Tropicana Field in St. Petersburg, Florida during the Rays' inaugural season. The Marlins moved into Marlins Park in the 2012 season; from 1998 to 2011, the games were played at the NFL's Miami Dolphins' Hard Rock Stadium (as it is currently named), though it has been known by several names in its existence. Overall, The Rays lead the series with 55 wins to the Marlins' 52.

Historical

Cincinnati Reds vs. Los Angeles Dodgers
The Dodgers–Reds rivalry was one of the most intense during the 1970s through the early 1990s. They often competed for the NL West division title. From 1970 to 1990, they had eleven 1–2 finishes in the standings, with seven of them being within 5½ games or fewer. Both teams also played in numerous championships during this span, combining to win 10 NL Pennants and 5 World Series titles from – Notably as the Big Red Machine teams clashed frequently with the Tommy Lasorda era Dodgers teams. Reds manager Sparky Anderson once said, "I don't think there's a rivalry like ours in either league. The Giants are supposed to be the Dodgers' natural rivals, but I don't think the feeling is there anymore. It's not there the way it is with us and the Dodgers." The rivalry ended when division realignment moved the Reds to the NL Central. However, they did face one another in the 1995 NLDS.

Kansas City Royals vs. New York Yankees
Major League Baseball's other big rivalry that started in the 1970s was the Kansas City Royals and New York Yankees. Despite never playing in the same division, the  Royals and Yankees developed quite a disdain for each other from mid 70s through the mid 80s. Starting in 1976, they met in the American League Championship Series for four out of five seasons - 1976 through 1980, with the Yankees winning all three, and in 1980, with Kansas City sweeping New York. The rival continued to 1983, which featured the Pine Tar Game in which Billy Martin requested that the umpires inspect George Brett's after he hit a two-run home run in the top of the ninth that gave Kansas City the 4–3. The umpires ruled that the amount of pine tar on the bat exceeded the amount allowed by rule, nullified Brett's home run, and called him out. As Brett was the third out in the ninth inning with the home team in the lead, the game ended with a Yankees win. The Royals protested the game, and American League president Lee MacPhail upheld their protest. MacPhail ordered that the game be continued from the point of Brett's home run. The game was resumed 25 days later on August 18, and officially ended with the Royals winning 5–4. The rivalry died when many of the main characters in the rivalry retired or moved to other teams via free agency (a new concept by the early 1980s). The Royals also went on a long re-build after team owner Ewing Kauffman died in 1993. From 1999-2010, Kansas City did not win a single series against New York.

Los Angeles Dodgers vs. New York Yankees

The Dodgers–Yankees rivalry is one of the most well-known rivalries in Major League Baseball. The two teams have met 11 times in the World Series, more times than any other pair of teams from the American and National Leagues. The initial significance was embodied in the two teams' proximity in New York City, when the Dodgers initially played in Brooklyn.

New York Yankees vs. San Francisco Giants

The rivalry between the New York Giants and New York Yankees was intense as both teams not only inhabited New York City but also, for a time, the same ballpark. During that era the opportunities for them to meet could only have been in a World Series. Both teams kicked off the first Subway Series between the NL and AL in 1921. The teams met once since the Giants moved to California, which was in the 1962 World Series, with the Yankees winning in seven.

Philadelphia Phillies vs. Pittsburgh Pirates

The rivalry between the Philadelphia Phillies and Pittsburgh Pirates was considered by some to be one of the best rivalries in the NL. The rivalry started when the Pittsburgh Pirates entered play in 1887, four years after the Phillies.

During the period of two-division play (1969–), the two National League East division rivals won the two highest numbers of division championships, the Pirates 9, the Phillies 6; together, the two teams' 15 championships accounted for more than half of the 25 NL East championships during that span.

The teams have since faced each other only in two series per year and the rivalry has effectively died in the years since the Pirates moved out of the NL East.

Philadelphia Phillies vs. Oakland Athletics

The rivalry between the Philadelphia Phillies and Oakland Athletics, also known as the Philadelphia City Series was at its most intense from 1901 to 1955, when the Oakland Athletics played in Philadelphia. The rivalry was significant not only because both teams played in Philadelphia, but because of the strong competition between the National and American Leagues. The competition between the leagues was so strong that the A's and Phillies did not play at all from 1901 to 1902 because of legal warring between the two parties. Related to growing tensions between the rival leagues, superstar Nap Lajoie had played for several years on the Phillies, but was displeased with the salary cap of $2,400 placed by the National League. When the American League was formed in 1901 and the A's joined it, Lajoie was offered a contract by Frank Hough of the Athletics on behalf of A's manager Connie Mack. When asked by a reporter what motivated him to leave, he responded "[Frank] Hough offered me $24,000 ($682,656 in current dollar terms) for four years. You can bet I signed in a hurry!" As a result, the Phillies filed a lawsuit to the Pennsylvania Supreme Court banning Lajoie from playing for any professional team. However, the decree only applied to teams in Pennsylvania, so Lajoie signed with the Cleveland Bronchos. When the decree expired, the Phillies chose not to file it again, and Lajoie left Cleveland to sign with the A's.

When the National League and American League merged in 1903, the rivalry became more friendly. Games between the two teams were played in many different stadiums throughout Philadelphia as older ones fell into disrepair and newer ones were built. Stadiums included Shibe Park, Philadelphia Park, as well as others. The final City Series game was played in 1954. In 1955, the Athletics moved to Kansas City after another dismal season in Philadelphia. The rivalry continued in spring training games until the Athletics moved to their permanent spring training facility in Mesa, Arizona. The rivalry has effectively died since then.

Toronto Blue Jays vs. Montreal Expos

Being the only two Canadian baseball teams in the major leagues, a rivalry between the Toronto Blue Jays and the Montreal Expos was inevitable. This rivalry was assisted by the presence of the Pearson Cup, an award that was given to the winner of a special midseason match (later incorporated into the MLB interleague schedule). However, this rivalry was subdued, as the two teams played in different leagues. In 2004, the rivalry came to an end when the Expos moved to Washington to become the Washington Nationals.

Boston Red Sox vs. St. Louis Cardinals
This rivalry was mainly played out in the World Series, in which the two teams met four times and split two series.

See also

 Major League Soccer rivalries
 National Basketball Association rivalries
 National Football League rivalries
 National Hockey League rivalries

References

Inline citations

Bibliography

External links
 Regional Postseason Series, Retrosheet
 Subway Series Yankees vs. Mets history and boxscores from Newsday

 
Rivalries